Nemapogon angulifasciella is a moth of the family Tineidae. It is found in North America, where it has been recorded from Alabama, Illinois, Indiana, Louisiana, Maine, Maryland, Massachusetts, Mississippi, North Carolina, South Carolina, Tennessee and West Virginia.

The wingspan is about 12 mm. Adults have been recorded on wing from April to October.

References

Moths described in 1905
Nemapogoninae